A. Max Brewer Bridge is a girder bridge in Titusville, Florida. The bridge cost $44.8 million to build.  Named in honor of Albert “Max” Brewer, a Titusville attorney in the 1950s who was killed in a private plane crash in 1966.  The bridge was selected for the People’s Choice Award, an award presented by the American Association of State Highway and Transportation Officials.

Reconstruction
The bridge was constructed because of the poor condition of the then-existing bridge, which could have caused its collapse. The high-level fixed bridge was placed over the low-level and short original bridge.

References 

Road bridges in Florida
Concrete bridges in Florida
Buildings and structures in Titusville, Florida
Bridges in Brevard County, Florida
Bridges over the Indian River (Florida)
1940s establishments in Florida
Bridges completed in 1949
Bridges completed in 2011